Protected areas of Canada consist of approximately 12.1 percent of the nation's landmass and freshwater are considered conservation areas, including 11.4 percent designated as protected areas. Approximately 13.8 percent of Canada's territorial waters are conserved, including 8.9 percent designated as protected areas.  Terrestrial areas conserved have  increased by 65 percent in the  21st century, while marine areas conserved have increased by more than 3,800 percent.

Conservation and protected areas have different mandates depending on the organization which manages them, with some areas having a greater focus on ecological integrity, historical preservation, public usage, scientific research, or a combination of usages. Some areas such as the  Polar Bear Pass, are co-managed and overseen by government and local indigenous agencies.

Canada's first National Park, Banff National Park established in 1885, spans  of mountainous terrain, with many glaciers and ice fields, dense coniferous forest, and alpine landscapes. Canada's  largest national wildlife region is the Scott Islands Marine National Wildlife Area, which spans , protects critical breeding and nesting habitat for over 40 percent of British Columbia's seabirds.

Legislation

Canada established the world's first national park management agency the Dominion Parks Branch now Parks Canada in 1911. In 1916, Canada and the United States signed the Migratory Birds Convention, which regulates the hunting of transcontinental migratory birds under the Migratory Birds Convention Act. The Canada Wildlife Act of 1973 goal is research on wildlife with a focus on larger species. The 1985  Fisheries Act regulates fishing, including the conservation and protection of fish and their spawning grounds. The National Marine Conservation Areas Act established  a system of national marine conservation areas in 2002. Canada's Species at Risk Act (SARA) is the federal government legislation  to prevent wildlife species from becoming extinct.

Conservation  agencies 

The primary focus of national parks is to preserve ecological integrity. These parks are administered by Parks Canada. National Marine Conservation Areas, while also under federal control, do not afford the same level of protection. The Canadian Wildlife Service, a division of Environment Canada, manages the National Wildlife Areas, Marine Wildlife Areas, and Migratory Bird Sanctuaries for the protection of wildlife. A Marine Wildlife Area is used to protect marine environments that are within Canada's Exclusive Economic Zone, extending  from the coastline. Two separate areas, one a National Wildlife Area and the other a Marine Wildlife Area, could be created to protect a contiguous zone covering land and marine features extending to the  limit.

Provincial and territorial governments also protect areas within their boundaries. Urban parks in Canada are operated by municipal governments for public recreation and foliage preservation in cities.

Another form of conservation is made by land owners who want to preserve nature for future generations by placing a covenant on their land.

Lists of  conserved areas and sites 

 List of Canadian protected areas
 List of National Parks of Canada
 List of National Wildlife Areas in Canada
 List of Migratory Bird Sanctuaries of Canada
 List of UNESCO Biosphere Reserves in Canada
 List of national historic sites of Canada
 List of World Heritage Sites in Canada

See also

Aquatic invasive species in Canada
Canadian Parks and Wilderness Society
List of invasive species in North America
List of Wildlife Species at Risk (Canada)
Wildlife of Canada

References